Piotr Gamrat of Sulima arms (1487 – 27 August 1545) was Archbishop of Gniezno and Primate of Poland.

Biography
Gamrat was born  in Samoklęski near Jasło, Poland. Early in his career, Gamrat was the royal secretary to Sigismund I the Old. Gamrat was bishop of Kamieniec since 1531, of Przemyśl since 1535, of Kraków since 1538 and simultaneously Archbishop of Gniezno since 1541. From 1540 until 1545 Marcin Kromer was Gamrat's secretary.

Gamrat actively fought the influence of the Protestant Reformation. He contributed to the development of sermons, reformed religious education in Poland, and reformed the local administration of the Catholic Churches. In addition to his activity in the dioceses, he led a secular lifestyle and participated in the political life of the state.

Notes

External links
 Virtual tour Gniezno Cathedral 
List of Primates of Poland 

1487 births
1545 deaths
People from Jasło County
Clan of Sulima
Ecclesiastical senators of the Polish–Lithuanian Commonwealth
Archbishops of Gniezno
Roman Catholic bishops of Przemyśl
Bishops of Kraków
Bishops of Płock
Canons of Gniezno
16th-century Roman Catholic archbishops in Poland